The 1991 Monte Carlo Open was a men's tennis tournament played on outdoor clay courts. It was the 85th edition of the Monte Carlo Open, and was part of the ATP Championship Series, Single-Week of the 1991 ATP Tour. It took place at the Monte Carlo Country Club in Roquebrune-Cap-Martin, France, near Monte Carlo, Monaco, from 22 April through 28 April 1991.

The men's singles field was headlined by Stefan Edberg and Boris Becker. Other top seeds in the field were Guy Forget, Andre Agassi, and Goran Ivanišević. Ninth-seeded Sergi Bruguera won the singles title.

Finals

Singles

 Sergi Bruguera defeated  Boris Becker, 5–7, 6–4, 7–6(8–6), 7–6(7–4)
 It was Bruguera's 2nd singles title of the year and of his career.

Doubles

 Luke Jensen /  Laurie Warder defeated  Paul Haarhuis /  Mark Koevermans, 5–7, 7–6, 6–4

References

External links
 
 ATP tournament profile
 ITF tournament edition details

 
Monte Carlo Open
Monte-Carlo Masters
1991 in Monégasque sport
Monte